

Academics and Writers

Academics
Sidibé Aminata Diallo

Scholars of Sankore Madrasah
Scholars wrote their own books as part of a socioeconomic model.  Students were charged with copying these books and any other books they could get their hands on.  Today there are over 700,000 manuscripts in Timbuktu with many dating back to West Africa's Golden Age (12th-16th centuries).

Ahmad Baba al Massufi (1556–1627)
Mohammed Bagayogo
Al-Qadi Aqib ibn Mahmud ibn Umar

Writers
Ahmad Baba al Massufi (1556–1627)
Abdoulaye Ascofaré (born 1949)
Ibrahima Aya (born 1967)
Amadou Hampâté Bâ (1900–1991)
Adame Ba Konaré (born 1947)
Massa Makan Diabaté (1938–1988)
Souéloum Diagho
Aïda Mady Diallo
Alpha Mandé Diarra (born 1954)
Doumbi Fakoly (born 1944)
Aoua Kéita (1912–1980)
Moussa Konaté
Yambo Ouologuem (born 1940)
Oumou Armand Diarra (born 1967)
Bernadette Sanou Dao (born 1952)
Aminata Traoré (born 1942)
Falaba Issa Traoré (1930–2003)
 Mady Ibrahim Kante (born 1982)

Entertainers and artists

Film directors
Abdoulaye Ascofaré
Souleymane Cissé
Adama Drabo
Assane Kouyaté
Cheick Oumar Sissoko
Falaba Issa Traoré
Sidy Fassara Diabaté

Griots 
Abdoulaye Diabaté
Baba Sissoko
Bakari Sumano (1935–2003)
Balla Tounkara
Djelimady Tounkara

Musicians
Khaira Arby (1959–2018)
Issa Bagayogo
Afel Bocoum
Fanta Damba
Toumani Diabaté
Yaya Diallo
Tiken Jah Fakoly
Mory Kanté
Salif Keita
Mamani Keïta
Habib Koité
Drissa Kone
Kandia Kouyaté
Moussa Kouyate
Amadou et Mariam
Fanta Sacko
Oumou Sangaré
Ko Kan Ko Sata
Baba Sissoko
Jali Nyama Suso
Tinariwen
Djelimady Tounkara
Ali Farka Touré
Vieux Farka Touré
Boubacar Traoré
Lobi Traoré
Rokia Traoré
Aya Nakamura
Mady Kouyate
Soriba Kouyate

Photographers
Alioune Bâ
Seydou Keïta
Malick Sidibé

Puppeteers
Yaya Coulibaly

Artists
Abdoulaye Konaté

Religious figures
Julien Mory Sidibé-Catholic bishop.
Sidi Yahya-Mosque/Madrassah named for him.

Rulers (pre-modern)

Partial list of mansas of the Mali Empire
Sundiata Keita (1240–1255)
Wali Keita (1255–1270)
Ouati Keita (1270–1274)
Khalifa Keita (1274–1275)
Abu Bakr (1275–1285)
Sakura (1285–1300)
Gao (1300–1305)
Mohammed ibn Gao (1305–1310)
Abubakari II (1310–1312)
Kankan Musa I (1312–1337)
Maghan (1337–1341)
Suleyman (1341–1360)
Kassa (1360)
Mari Diata II (1360–1374)
Musa II (1374–1387)
Magha II (1387–1389)
Sandaki (1389–1390)
Mahmud (1390–1400)

Note: As the Mali Empire and the modern nation of Mali substantially overlap most of these names likely do apply, but some may not.

Bambara Empire
Bitòn Coulibaly
Ngolo Diarra (1766–1795)
Mansong Diarra (1795–1808)

Massina Empire
Seku Amadu (1820–1845)
Amadu II of Masina (1845–1852)
Amadu III of Masina (1852–1862)

Various kingdoms
 Sulayman Bal (died 1775)
 Babemba Traoré-Kénédougou

Modern politicians
 Ahmed Mohamed ag Hamani
 Soumaïla Cissé
 Mamadou Dembelé - former Prime Minister
 Yoro Diakité - former Prime Minister
 Sidibé Aminata Diallo
 Daba Diawara
 Moustapha Dicko
 Tiébilé Dramé
 Ibrahim Boubacar Keïta
 Modibo Keïta
 Alpha Oumar Konaré
 Garan Fabou Kouyate
 Aoua Kéita
 Choguel Kokalla Maïga - Patriotic Movement for Renewal
 Ousmane Issoufi Maïga
 Moctar Ouane
 Ahmed Diane Semega
 Mandé Sidibé
 Sidibe Korian Sidibe
 Cheick Oumar Sissoko
 Soumana Sacko - former Prime Minister
 Abdoulaye Sékou Sow - former Prime Minister
 Ousmane Sy
 Mountaga Tall
 Ascofare Oulematou Tamboura
 Amadou Toumani Touré
 Younoussi Touré - former Prime Minister
 Dioncounda Traoré - Party President of the Alliance for Democracy in Mali
 Moussa Traoré
 Aminata Traoré
 Yeah Samake

Scientists
Cheick Modibo Diarra - astrophysicist
Nassif Ghoussoub - mathematician

Sportspeople

Basketball players
Ousmane Cisse
Soumaila Samake

Footballers
Sedonoude Abouta
Mamadou Bagayoko
Adama Coulibaly
Moussa Coulibaly (born 1981) - footballer
Soumaila Coulibaly
Cheick Oumar Dabo
Mamadou Diallo - footballer
Souleymane Diamoutene
Mahamadou Diarra
Fousseni Diawara
Mintou Doucoure
Frédéric Kanouté
Jimmy Kebe
Salif Keita - footballer
Seydou Keita - footballer
Djibril Konaté
Amadou Konte
Tenema N'Diaye
Mamady Sidibe
Rafan Sidibé
Mohamed Sissoko
Adama Tamboura
Fousseni Tangara
Jean Tigana
Alhassane Touré
Alioune Touré
Abdou Traoré
Alou Traoré
Djimi Traoré
Dramane Traoré

Olympic athletes
Cheick Bathily
Mamadi Berthe
Drissa Diakite
Soumaila Diakite
Boucader Diallo
Boubacar Koné

References